"Devils and Angels" is a song written and performed by Toby Lightman, issued as the first single from her first studio album Little Things. The song was originally released on December 2, 2003 leading to a peak position of #17 on the Billboard adult top 40 chart. It was re-released on December 7, 2004.

Music video

The official music video for the song was directed by Liz Friedlander.

Chart positions

References

External links
 

2003 debut singles
Lava Records singles
Music videos directed by Liz Friedlander
Songs written by Toby Lightman
Toby Lightman songs
2003 songs